Commonwealth is the third full novel written by the American author Joey Goebel.

Plot summary
Somewhere in the middle of America dwells Blue Gene Mapother, a trashy, mullet-headed Wal-Mart stockboy-turned-flea marketer who staunchly supports any American war effort without question. Besides patriotism, little enlivens him besides pro wrestling, cigarette breaks, and any instance in which he thinks his masculinity is at stake. Curiously, he is also a member of one of the wealthiest families in the country.

His mother, the fanatical Christian socialite Elizabeth Mapother, has a prophetic dream in which she sees Blue Gene’s older brother, the handsome but nervous John Hurstbourne Mapother, becoming an apocalyptic world savior. In order to fulfill his mother’s prophecy—not to mention his father Henry’s lifelong desire for his bloodline to ascend to Washington—John is running for Congress.

John soon finds that as a corporate executive he is not popular with his largely working-class constituents, many of whom work for him and his father. Now, after years of estrangement, the Mapothers need Blue Gene’s common man touch in order to cast their family name in a more favorable light with the voters. The Mapothers no longer shun Blue Gene for his embarrassing, low-class ways; they embrace him as political gold.

Will Blue Gene allow himself to be used?  His family has ignored him the last four years and has only invited him back into the fold as campaign time looms near.  But then again, even though the superrich John Hurstbourne Mapother clearly represents the interests of big business, man, he sure does have all the right values.

Through dark humor and cinematic story-telling, this small-town epic goes from a flea market to mansions to abandoned Wal-Mart buildings, dramatizing the deranged, absurd relationship between the high and low class of America.

Characters in Commonwealth
Blue Gene Mapother  The protagonist of this novel, Blue Gene is the younger son of Henry and Elizabeth Mapother.  Born into money, Blue Gene has decided to live a life sans luxury, selling his childhood toys at a flea market.
John Mapother  The older brother to Blue Gene, father of Arthur, and oldest son of Henry and Elizabeth Mapother, serves as a lifelong foil for Blue Gene, being the older, perfect son running for a seat in the House of Representatives.
Arthur Mapother  The only son of John and Abby Mapother.
Henry Mapother  The patriarch of the Mapother clan, also, he serves as the driving force behind John's campaign, and the wedge driven between John and Eugene.
Elizabeth Mapother
Abby Mapother
Joshua Balsam
Jackie Stepchild

See also

The Anomalies (2003)
Torture the Artist (2004)

References

External links
 Official site of Joey Goebel
 Commonwealth's MySpace Page

2008 American novels
MacAdam/Cage books